Nedbank Cup is a South African club football (soccer) tournament. The knockout tournament, based on the English FA Cup format, was one of a weak opponent facing a stronger one. The competition was sponsored by ABSA until 2007, after which Nedbank took over sponsorship.

The winner of the 2012–13 Nedbank Cup will qualify for the 2014 CAF Confederation Cup.

Format
The 16 Premier Soccer League clubs, 8 National First Division teams, as well as 8 teams from the amateur ranks compete for the prize money of R6 million. The winner also qualifies for the CAF Confederation Cup.

The preliminary round features all 16 National First Division teams and will be reduced to eight when the teams play on 12 December 2012.

The teams are not seeded at any stage, and the first 16 sides drawn out of the hat receive a home-ground advantage. There are no longer any replays in the tournament, and any games which end in a draw after 90 minutes are subject to 30 minutes extra time followed by penalties if necessary.

Teams
The 32 teams competing in the Nedbank Cup competition are: (listed according to their league that they are playing in).

Premier Soccer League

 1. Ajax Cape Town
 2. AmaZulu
 3. Bidvest Wits
 4. Black Leopards
 5. Bloemfontein Celtic
 6. Chippa United
 7. Free State Stars
 8. Golden Arrows

 9. Kaizer Chiefs
 10. Mamelodi Sundowns
 11. Maritzburg United
 12. Moroka Swallows
 13. Orlando Pirates
 14. Platinum Stars
 15. Supersport United
 16. University of Pretoria

National First Division

 17. African Warriors
 18. Dynamos
 19. Jomo Cosmos
 20. Milano United

 21. Polokwane City
 22. United FC
 23. Vasco Da Gama
 24. Witbank Spurs

Vodacom League

 25. Cape Town All Stars
 26. Island FC
 27. Jacksa Spears
 28. Magesi FC

 29. Maluti FET College
 30. Mbombela United
 31. Temba Royals FC
 32. Vardos FC

Results

Preliminary round

The preliminary round will see National First Division sides play each other is a knockout round to decide who will compete in the 2013 Nedbank Cup. All the game were scheduled to be played on 12 December 2012, but were postponed to 12 February 2013 due to a technical issue regarding the validity of the Rules for the preliminary qualification round  and the winners of each game will go into the draw to determine the fixtures for the first round.

First round (round of 32)
The draw for the First round of the Nedbank Cup was done on Monday 15 January 2013. The first round ties will be played the weekend of February 22–24 and February 27, with the exact dates, venues and kick-off times to be decided by the PSL Cup Committee.

Second round (round of 16)

Quarter-finals

Semi-finals

Final

External links
Nedbank Cup Official Website
Nedbank Official Website
Premier Soccer League
South African Football Association
Confederation of African Football

Notes and references

2012–13 domestic association football cups
2012–13 in South African soccer
2012-13